Miss Grand Brazil 2019 was the second edition of the Miss Grand Brazil beauty pageant, held on February 28, 2019, at the Dall'Onder Grande Hotel in Bento Gonçalves, Rio Grande do Sul. Twenty-two contestants, who qualified for the national stage through state contests held by the Concurso Nacional de Beleza (CNB Brazil), competed for the title, of whom a nutrition student and model resident of Mooca representing the state of São Paulo, Marjorie Marcelle, was elected the winner. She later represented Brazil at the Miss Grand International 2019 contest held that year on October 25 in Venezuela, and was named the fourth runner-up.

The contest was showcased under the direction of Henrique and Marina Fusquine Fontes, presidents of the CNB Brazil, who have owned the Miss Grand Brazil license since 2015. The tournament's grand gala final was broadcast via Cartão de Visita, which is part of the news portal R7, one of the three most accessed in the country, as well as on the official Facebook page of its parent platform, Miss Grand International.

Miss Grand International 2018 from Paraguay Clara Sosa, and the president of Miss Grand International Nawat Itsaragrisil, attended the competition since the pageant boot camp on February 26. The mayor of Bento Gonçalves Guilherme Pasin was present in the final event with the first lady, Cynthia Pasin, as well as the Secretary of Tourism of Bento Gonçalves, Rodrigo Ferri Parisotto.

Competition
In the grand final competition held on February 28, the results of the preliminary competition—which consisted of the swimsuit and evening gown competition and the closed-door interview—determined the 15 semifinalists. The top 15 competed in the swimsuit round and were narrowed down to the top 12, who then competed in the evening gown round and were further cut down to the last nine finalists. The nine qualified candidates delivered a speech related to the pageant campaign, "Stop wars and violence," which determined the last five semifinalists, who then competed in the question and answer portion. After this, Miss Grand Brazil 2019 and her four runners-up were announced.

The summary of the selection process is shown below.

Result

Main placement

Special awards

Note
  Automatically qualified for the top 15 finalists after winning the fast tack, Miss Popularity.

Contestants
Twenty-two contestants competed for the title of Miss Grand Brazil 2019.

 – Gabriela Ribeiro
 – Fabielle Pereira
 – Luiza Braz
 – Yasmin Martins
 – Laís Barros
 – Amanda Cardoso
 – Claudianne Vacarezza
 – Amanda Brenner
 – Thaisa Cristina Boeno
 – Mato Grosso do Sul
 – Lorena Rodrigues
 – Thalita Maués
 – Jéssica Costa
 – Poliana Rosa
 – Eslovênia Marques
 – Isabelle Pandini
 – Vanessa Salva
 – Gisele Cristina
 – Thylara Brenner
 – Marjorie Marcelle
 – Gabriela Santana
 – Monique Freitas

References

External links

 

Miss Grand Brazil
Grand Brazil